Derek Allan Pellicci (born 18 February 1953) is an English-born Australian drummer. He is best known as a founding member of Little River Band. Pellicci lives in Melbourne with his wife, Anne and a son.

Early life
In 1960, Pellicci's family, his father Arthur, mother Jessie and older brother John, emigrated to Melbourne, Victoria, Australia as "Ten Pound Poms".

In 1964, his older brother John took the then 11-year-old Pellicci to see The Beatles greet their "sea" of fans from the balcony of Melbourne's Southern Cross Hotel. Pellicci said he was spellbound by the experience and it moulded his career path. Shortly after, John bought him a Trixon drum kit which had been traded in at a local car dealer. With his passion for music now fully determined, Pellicci's school attendance took second billing to his beloved drum practice (which entailed playing along with every pop record he could get his hands on!)

After the family moved to King Island, Tasmania in 1966, Pellicci attended the local high school while John and Arthur took jobs at the King Island Scheelite mine. This rural culture shock was magnified by the fact that Pellicci was passionate about music but had to wait up to a month for the latest pop 45s to be freighted over from mainland Victoria.

Early career
In 1968 Pellicci returned to Melbourne to pursue his music career in earnest, first with the semi-pro band Recital, then his first professional group Plum.

The break-up of Plum led to stints with various groups: Ash (initially under the name Derek Allen), Arthur & The Argonauts, Island, Blackfeather and New Zealand Highway.

Mississippi

In 1972 Pellicci joined a new band, Mississippi (featuring future Little River Band members, Graeham Goble and Beeb Birtles). Mississippi not only served to develop his studio skills, but also was an orientation into the gruelling road tours that lay ahead. This led to more studio experience, both in recordings with Mississippi and session work in radio jingles and recordings with other artists.

In 1974 Mississippi sailed for England (coincidentally on the same ship that had brought Pellicci to Australia, the Fairsky).

Whilst in the UK, Pellicci was stunned to learn he had been adopted as a baby. In 2003, he learnt that his birth mother, Gladys Sylvia Hadley had died in Jerusalem on 29 May 1990. Pellicci never met either of his biological parents.

Little River Band

In 1975 Mississippi returned to Australia and commenced rehearsals with new lead singer Glenn Shorrock, subsequently changing their name to Little River Band.  Three years later, in 1978, two significant events occurred in Pellicci's life. In May he suffered a serious burns accident which hospitalised him for two months. In December of that year, he married his longtime girlfriend, Anne Deacon.

Pellicci played drums on John Farnham's adult contemporary album Uncovered with guitarists Tommy Emmanuel, David Briggs, Barry Sullivan, Mal Logan and Peter Jones in 1980.

In April 1981, Pellicci and the other band members flew out to the Caribbean island of Montserrat to record the album Time Exposure with legendary Beatles producer George Martin.

After the departure of Beeb Birtles from Little River Band, in 1984, Pellicci also quit the band and he and his wife Anne moved to Los Angeles to focus on his songwriting. Cold Chisel's Stephen Prestwich replaced Pellicci. Pellicci played on all 13 of Little River Band's Top 40 US hits.

Pellicci and Anne moved back to Australia for the birth of their son Joel in 1985. Over the next few years Pellicci worked on projects with well-known artists including Colin Hay, Daryl Braithwaite, Stevie Wright, Shirley Strachan, Ross Wilson, Marc Hunter, Stephen Cummings, Joe Camilleri, Renee Geyer, Eddie Rayner and Goanna, amongst others. He also composed lyrics for Japanese pop star, Yōsui Inoue's 'English language' album.

In 1988 Pellicci reunited with Little River Band (Birtles, David Briggs and George McArdle did not participate) for a triumphant show at the opening of the Brisbane World Expo 88 with a special guest, Eagles member Glenn Frey. Little River Band performed with Warren Zevon and Christopher Cross as special guest members and continued to tour internationally for at least three months every year after the Brisbane Expo. At this time he co-wrote three songs for Little River Band's album Monsoon, and in a joint acknowledgement of their emigration experience, co-wrote "I Dream Alone" with Glenn Shorrock for the Get Lucky album.

After the completion of a successful US tour in 1997, Pellicci played his last show with Little River Band in Biloxi, Mississippi and subsequently retired from the music business.

The classic line-up of Goble, Birtles, Pellicci, Shorrock, Briggs and McArdle reunited for a live performance of "Help Is on Its Way" at Little River Band's induction into the ARIA Hall of Fame in 2004.

Further reading

References

External links
 Graeham Goble official site
 Little River Band official site
 Beeb Birtles official site
 milesago.com
 lrb.net
 Peter Beckett official site
 Tony Sciuto website
 Little River Band: Born in the Sign of Water

1953 births
Living people
English people of Italian descent
English rock drummers
British soft rock musicians
Musicians from London
English emigrants to Australia
Australian rock drummers
Australian people of Italian descent
Little River Band members
Mississippi (band) members